Green Onions is the debut album by Booker T. & the M.G.'s, released on Stax Records in October 1962. It reached number 33 on the pop album chart in the month of its release. The title single was a worldwide hit and has been covered by dozens of artists, including the Blues Brothers and Roy Buchanan (both with Steve Cropper on guitar), as well as The Ventures, Al Kooper, The Shadows, Mongo Santamaría, Deep Purple (Live and studio versions) and Count Basie.

Three previous Stax LPs – two by the Mar-Keys, one by Carla Thomas – had been issued on Atlantic Records. Green Onions was the first album released on the Stax label. It was also Stax's first charting album, peaking at number 33 on the Billboard 200. The album features only instrumental songs and features Steve Cropper playing a Fender Telecaster.

The album was included in Robert Dimery's 1001 Albums You Must Hear Before You Die.

Track listing

Personnel
Booker T. & the M.G.s
Booker T. Jones – Hammond M3 organ
Steve Cropper – electric guitar
Lewie Steinberg – double bass and bass
Al Jackson Jr. – drums
Technical
Haig Adishian - cover design
Irving Schild - cover photography

Chart history

Notes

Booker T. & the M.G.'s albums
1962 debut albums
Stax Records albums
Atlantic Records albums
Albums produced by Jim Stewart (record producer)